Collington railway station serves Collington, at the western end of Bexhill in East Sussex. It is on the East Coastway Line, and train services are provided by Southern.

The station has had several name changes: it was opened as Collington Wood Halt on 11 September 1905; closed a year later, it reopened as West Bexhill Halt, and then became Collington Halt in 1929; the Halt was dropped in 1969.

The station has two platforms linked by a footbridge. There are ticket machines on both platforms which have recently replaced the Permit to Travel machines. There are also train information displays on both sides of the station, as well as an information box with an automated announcer providing departure announcements.

The station's sponsorship has recently been acquired by Hastings Direct who now advertise below the station's nameplate.

Services 
All services at Collington are operated by Southern using  EMUs and  DMUs. 

The typical off-peak service in trains per hour is:

 1 tph to  via 
 1 tph to 
 1 tph to 

References

External links 

Railway stations in East Sussex
DfT Category F1 stations
Former London, Brighton and South Coast Railway stations
Railway stations in Great Britain opened in 1905
Railway stations in Great Britain closed in 1906
Railway stations in Great Britain opened in 1911
Railway stations served by Govia Thameslink Railway
Bexhill-on-Sea